Carmenta surinamensis is a moth of the family Sesiidae. It was described by Heinrich Benno Möschler in 1878, and is known from Brazil, Suriname, Guyana, Trinidad, Panama and Costa Rica. The larvae of the species have been found on seeds of the plant Prioria copaifera, Pentaclethra macroloba, and plants in the genus Mora.

References

Sesiidae
Moths described in 1878